Avizafone (Pro-Diazepam) is a water-soluble prodrug of the benzodiazepine derivative diazepam. It can be administered intramuscularly.

Avizafone is metabolised by enzymes in the blood to form the active drug diazepam. It is used mainly as an antidote to poisoning with organophosphate nerve agents.

See also 
 Alprazolam triazolobenzophenone
 Rilmazafone

References 

Antidotes
2-Aminobenzophenones
GABAA receptor positive allosteric modulators
Benzodiazepine prodrugs